Tourist in This Town is the debut solo album by Allison Crutchfield, a former member and co-founder of the bands P.S. Eliot and Swearin'. It was released on January 27, 2017 on Merge Records, and produced by Jeff Zeigler.

Critical reception

Tourist in This Town received mostly favorable reviews from music critics; according to review aggregator website Metacritic, it has a score of 82 out of 100, indicating "universal acclaim" from critics. One of these favorable reviews was written by Pitchfork's Jazz Monroe, who gave the album a score of 7.8 out of 10, writing that it "channels the kind of late-80s synth pop that jettisoned style in favor of vastness and grace—skyline synths pirouette, vocals implore, pensive guitars sporadically erupt."

Track listing
 Broad Daylight – 3:30 
 I Don’t Ever Wanna Leave California – 2:24 
 Charlie – 2:30 
 Dean’s Room – 4:16 
 Sightseeing – 4:38 
 Expatriate – 2:30 
 Mile Away – 3:57 
 The Marriage – 0:55 
 Secret Lives and Deaths – 3:20 
 Chopsticks on Pots and Pans – 4:28

Personnel 
Sam Cook–Parrott – 	bass, guitar, vocals
Allison Crutchfield – 	arranger, guitar, piano, primary artist, producer, synthesizer, vocals
Katie Crutchfield – 	vocals
Joey Doubek – 	drums, percussion
Maggie Fost – 	design
Maria Rice – 	assistant mastering engineer
Jesse Riggins – 	photography
Jeff Zeigler – 	drum programming, engineer, mastering, producer, synthesizer

References

2017 debut albums
Merge Records albums